Anāl Naga (Anal Naga) may refer to:
 Anāl Naga people (Anal Naga people)  
 Anāl Naga language (Anal Naga language)